Kimiko Date-Krumm and Zhang Shuai were the defending champions but decided not to participate.
Eleni Daniilidou and Casey Dellacqua, defeated Laura Robson and Heather Watson, 6–4, 6–2, to take the title.

Seeds

Draw

Draw

References
 Main Draw

Aegon Trophy - Doubles
2012 Women's Doubles